Nicopolis or Nikopolis ("city of victory") was a town of ancient Bithynia, on the Bosphorus. Pliny the Elder notes that it stood upon a Gulf which in his time still bore the name, north from Chrysopolis.

Its precise site is unlocated.

References

Populated places in Bithynia
Former populated places in Turkey
Roman towns and cities in Turkey
Populated places of the Byzantine Empire
History of Istanbul Province
Lost ancient cities and towns